Dewayne Pemberton (born August 16, 1956) is a Republican member of the Oklahoma State Senate, representing the 9th district. He was initially elected in November 2015.  He is a retired coach, teacher and education administrator.

References

Living people
Republican Party Oklahoma state senators
Politicians from Muskogee, Oklahoma
1956 births
21st-century American politicians